Michelle "Mikey" Gardner, formerly Michelle Bolster, is an American softball coach and former player.  She was the head coach of the Indiana Hoosiers softball team from 2009 until 2017.  She previously served as the head coach at the University of Nevada from 2003 to 2008.  She also served as an assistant softball coach at Arizona State (1999–2001) and Florida State (1995–1998).

Gardner was a right-handed pitcher for the Michigan Wolverines softball team from 1985 to 1988 and for the Raybestos Brakettes from 1994 to 1995.  She was named the Big Ten Conference Player of the Year in 1988.

Early years
A native of Petersburg, Michigan, Gardner grew up in Monroe County, Michigan.  She was an all-state softball player at Summerfield High School.  She led Summerfield to a 26–1 record and a state championship in 1984.

University of Michigan
Bolster played college softball for the Michigan Wolverines softball team from 1985 to 1988.  She had two no-hitters during her Michigan career, one on May 3, 1985, and the other on May 4, 1988.  During the 1988 season, she was Michigan's co-captain.  That year, she compiled a 0.94 earned run average against Big Ten Conference opponents and was named the Big Ten Player of the Year and Michigan's Most Valuable Player; she was also named to the NFCA All-Mideast Region team in 1988.

Professional softball
Bolster later played professional softball for the Raybestos Brakettes from 1994 to 1995.  The Brakettes dominated the sport, winning 34 national championship games from 1958 to 1993 in the Women's World softball tournaments.  In a 2000 profile on the Brakettes, The New York Times wrote that pitchers Joan Joyce, Bolster and others "made the team virtually unbeatable."

Coaching career
Gardner was the head coach of the Indiana Hoosiers softball from 2009 to 2017. In her first five seasons as the head coach at Indiana, she compiled a record of 108–153.

Gardner previously served as the head coach at the University of Nevada from 2003 to 2008.  She compiled a 187–176 recordat Nevada.  After leading Nevada to a 44–18 record in 2008, she was named the Western Athletic Conference Coach of the Year.

She also served as an assistant softball coach at Arizona State (1999–2001) and Florida State (1995–1998).

Personal
Garner is married to William Gardner.  They have one son and two daughters.

References

1960s births
Living people
Michigan Wolverines softball players
American softball coaches
Arizona State Sun Devils softball coaches
Florida State Seminoles softball coaches
Indiana Hoosiers softball coaches
Nevada Wolf Pack softball coaches
People from Monroe County, Michigan
Softball players from Michigan